Ben Chan Han-pan (born 1975) is a member of Hong Kong Legislative Council (Geographical constituency New Territories South West) and was a member of Tsuen Wan District Council (Yeung Uk Road). He is a member of Democratic Alliance for the Betterment of Hong Kong, a pro-establishment party in Hong Kong. He is an engineer and graduated from Bachelor of Mechanical Engineering and Master of Science of Material Science and Engineering of Hong Kong University of Science and Technology.

In February 2021, Chan criticized RTHK, claiming it had been abusing its editorial independence, and that the new director, Patrick Li, could fix its "credibility" issues. In contrast, the RTHK's Programme Staff Union stated that they had serious doubts about Patrick Li, and that the government had made moves to strip editorial independence from RTHK.

Link 
 Ben Chan's official website

References 

1975 births
Living people
Democratic Alliance for the Betterment and Progress of Hong Kong politicians
Alumni of the Hong Kong University of Science and Technology
District councillors of Tsuen Wan District
New Territories Association of Societies politicians
HK LegCo Members 2012–2016
HK LegCo Members 2016–2021
HK LegCo Members 2022–2025
Members of the Election Committee of Hong Kong, 2012–2017
Hong Kong pro-Beijing politicians